Condurrite is a name given to a mixture of cuprite, domeykite and tenorite. It takes its name from the Great Condurrow Mine at Troon, Cornwall in the United Kingdom, which is regarded as the type locality.

References

Minerals